The Apple Wireless Keyboard is a wireless keyboard built for Macintosh computers and compatible with iOS devices. It interacts over Bluetooth wireless technology and unlike its wired version, it has no USB connectors or ports. Both generations have low-power features when not in use.
It was discontinued on October 13, 2015, and was succeeded by the new Magic Keyboard.

History

First generation (A1016) M9270LL/A (4 batteries)  

The first generation Apple Wireless Keyboard was released at the Apple Expo on September 16, 2003.

It was based on the updated wired Apple Keyboard (codenamed A1048), and featured white plastic keys housed in a clear plastic shell. Unlike the wired keyboard, there are no USB ports to connect external devices. The bottom of the keyboard features space for four AA batteries and has an on/off switch.

Second generation (A1255) MB167LL/A (3 batteries) 

On August 7, 2007, Apple released a redesigned model of the Apple Wireless Keyboard. Like the wired Apple Keyboard, the new model is thinner than its predecessors and has an aluminum enclosure. Another addition was the new functions added to the function keys, such as media controls and Dashboard control. Unlike the previous version, the Wireless Keyboard now has a layout similar to the MacBook. The power button has been relocated to the right side of the keyboard, and the layout does not include a numeric keypad. This model added accidental caps lock prevention: the key has to be held down for a moment for caps lock to engage. This keyboard required only three AA batteries, one fewer than its predecessor.

Third generation (A1314) MC184LL/A (2 batteries) 

In October 2009, a slightly revised third model was released. New model number A1314 replaced the A1255, two years and two months after the initial release. The new model now uses only two AA batteries instead of three originally. Additionally, Mac OS X 10.5.8 is now the minimum OS over the original Mac OS X 10.4.10. This model of keyboard became standard with new generation of iMacs introduced on the same day.

Fourth generation (A1314) MC184LL/B (chargeable/2 batteries) 
On July 20, 2011, following the release of Mac OS X 10.7/OS X Lion, Apple updated the keyboard slightly, updating the label on the Exposé key to Mission Control and changing the Dashboard key to a Launchpad key.

Languages and layouts 
Keyboard layouts with a rectangular Enter key are available in American English and Korean.

Keyboard layouts with L-shaped Enter keys are available in:

 Arabic
 Belgian
 Croatian
 Czech
 Danish

 Dutch
 English (International)
 English (British)
 French
 German

 Greek
 Hebrew
 Hungarian
 Italian
 Norwegian

 Polish
 Portuguese
 Romanian
 Russian
 Slovak

 Slovenian
 Spanish
 Swedish
 Swiss
 Turkish F/Q

Boot Camp keyboard mapping in Windows 
Due to the missing keys for Windows PCs (such as the PrintScreen Key), Apple has made keyboard mappings.

Note. These keyboard mappings will work on a Mac operating under Windows 7 when running Boot Camp, but may not work if the user selects the Boot Camp option of "Use all F1, F2, etc. keys as standard function keys"

Non-Apple support 
Although Apple includes support solely for Macintosh computers, it can also be used on a Microsoft Windows PC providing that a Bluetooth receiver and appropriate Bluetooth stack is installed and properly configured.

The Linux kernel supports Apple Wireless Keyboards via the hid-apple module, which is present in 2.6.x+ kernels.

See also 
 Apple Wireless Mouse
 Magic Keyboard (Mac)
 Apple Keyboard
 Apple Extended Keyboard
 Magic Trackpad

References

External links 

Apple Wireless Keyboard at Apple.com (archived 2003-10-08, 2007-08-08, 2009-11-04, 2011-07-23)
Aluminum Keyboard Firmware Update 1.0 (archived 2009-02-12)

Macintosh keyboards
Foxconn
Computer-related introductions in 2005
Products and services discontinued in 2015